Mordella rufoaxillaris is a species of beetle in the genus Mordella of the family Mordellidae, which is part of the superfamily Tenebrionoidea. It was described in 1860.

References

Beetles described in 1860
rufoaxillaris